Lifelines is the seventh studio album by Norwegian band A-ha, released on 24 April 2002 by WEA Records. The album topped the charts in Norway and Germany, while reaching the top 10 in Austria, Denmark, Poland and Switzerland. In 2019, Lifelines and Minor Earth Major Sky, both of A-ha's albums recorded for Warner Music Germany, were remastered and re-released with an extra disc, which contained demos, early versions and alternate mixes. They also received first official vinyl releases.

Singles and videos
The video for the single "Forever Not Yours" was shot in Havana, Cuba. It was directed by Harald Zwart (who also directed the "Velvet" video) and the storyline is based on the story of Noah's Ark and today's celebrities. Look-alikes of Desmond Tutu, Madonna, and Queen Elizabeth II are included, among others.

The video for the single "Lifelines" features segments from the 1991 short film Året gjennom Børfjord, also known as A Year Along the Abandoned Road. In the short film a camera moves through a small village in Finnmark, Norway, while the seasons change.

Cover art
The cover for the album was made by Andy Frank during the shooting of the music video for "Forever Not Yours" in Havana. It is an edited image of Jose Marti Parque Stadium. In the booklet there are also images of old theatre and old American cars as well as other views which can be found on the streets of Havana.

Track listing

Notes
  signifies an additional producer
 The Russian version of the album contains an introduction spoken by Morten Harket in Russian.

Personnel 
A-ha
 Morten Harket – vocals
 Magne Furuholmen – keyboards
 Paul Waaktaar-Savoy – guitars

Additional musicians
 Martin Landquist – additional instruments (1, 12, 13), additional loops (4)
 Sven Lindvall – bass (1, 2, 3, 7, 8, 11, 13, 14)
 Jørun Bøgeberg – bass (9, 10)
 Per Lindvall – drums (1, 2, 3, 7-11, 13, 14, 15)
 Attila Cederbygd – programmed beats (12)
 Joakim Milder – string arrangements (1, 5, 7, 8, 11, 15)
 Stockholm Session Strings – strings (1, 7, 8, 11, 15)
 Vertavo Quartet – strings (5)
 Anneli Drecker – female vocals (1, 11)

Technical
 Ulf Holand – engineer (1, 2, 3, 8, 11, 13, 15), Pro Tools operator (1, 2, 3, 8, 11, 13, 15)
 Bob Kraushaar – engineer (3), mixing (8)
 Mike Hartung – engineer (4-7, 9, 10, 15), Pro Tools operator (4-7, 9, 10, 15)
 Janne Hansson – string recording (1, 5, 7, 8, 11, 15)
 Michael Brauer – mixing (1-7, 9, 10, 13, 15)
 Carl-Michael Herlöfsson – mixing (12)
 Clive Langer – mixing (14)
 Alan Winstanley – mixing (14)
 Stephen Hague – Logic operator (1, 2, 3, 11), mixing (8, 11)
 Martin Landquist – Logic operator (1, 2, 11, 12, 13)
 Kjitel Bjerkestrand – Pro Tools operator (13, 15)
 George Marino – mastering at Sterling Sound (New York City, New York, USA) (1, 4-7, 9, 10, 11, 13, 14, 15)
 René Schardt – mastering at Galaxy Studios (Mol, Belgium) (2, 3, 8, 12)

Production and Visual
 Yiva Neumann – production coordinator, personal manager 
 Jan Walaker – design, photography 
 Thomas Knutstad – additional design 
 Olaf Heine – band photography 
 Andy Frank – cover photography
 Sverre Flatby – managing director 
 Brian Lane – management (London)

Charts

Weekly charts

Year-end charts

Certifications

References

External links
 
 The making of "A Year along the Abandoned Road"

2002 albums
A-ha albums
Albums produced by Alan Winstanley
Albums produced by Clive Langer
Albums produced by Stephen Hague
Warner Music Group albums